Two ships of the Royal Navy have borne the name HMS Dover Prize, indicating they were ships taken as prizes by one of the ships named . Both ships in this case were captured by the same .

  was a hulk captured in 1689 and wrecked that same year.
  was a 32-gun fifth rate, previously the French ship Legere. She was captured in 1693 and was sold in 1698.

Royal Navy ship names